The 2020–21 Brøndby IF season was Brøndby IF's 40th consecutive season in top-division of the Danish football league, the 31st consecutive in Danish Superliga, and the 55th as a football club. Besides the Superliga, the club also competed in the 2020–21 Danish Cup, losing in the fourth round to Danish 1st Division side Fremad Amager. It was the second season with head coach Niels Frederiksen, after he replaced caretaker manager Martin Retov during the previous campaign.

On 24 May 2021, Brøndby were confirmed as Danish Superliga champions for the first time in 16 years following their 2–0 defeat of Nordsjælland.

Management team

Players

Squad information

Youth players in use

Transfers

In

Summer

Winter

Out

Summer

Loan out

Summer

Winter

Pre-season and friendlies

Competitions

Overview

Superliga

Results summary

Results by matchday

Regular season

Championship round

Matches

Regular season

Championship round

Danish Cup

Statistics

Goalscorers

Last updated: 24 May 2021

Clean sheets

Last updated: 24 May 2021

Discipline

References 

Brøndby IF seasons
Danish football clubs 2020–21 season